Siedliska  is a village in the administrative district of Gmina Wydminy, within Giżycko County, Warmian-Masurian Voivodeship, in north-eastern Poland.

It is located in the region of Masuria.

History
The origins of the village date back to 1555, when a man named Sebastian bought land to establish a village. The name Siedliska is of Polish origin and is a common name for villages throughout Poland. As of 1625, the population was solely Polish. In the late 19th century, the village had a population of 692.

Transport
The Voivodeship road 655 runs through Siedliska, and there is a train station in the village.

References

Villages in Giżycko County
1555 establishments in Poland
Populated places established in 1555